More than 96% of population of Bosnia and Herzegovina belongs to one of its three autochthonous constituent peoples: Bosniaks, Serbs and Croats. The term constituent refers to the fact that these three ethnic groups are explicitly mentioned in the constitution, and that none of them can be considered a minority or immigrant. The most easily recognizable feature that distinguishes the three ethnic groups is their religion, with Bosniaks predominantly Muslim, Serbs predominantly Orthodox Christians, and Croats Catholic.

Bosniaks, Croats, and Serbs speak the Shtokavian dialect of a pluricentric language known in linguistics as Serbo-Croatian. The question of standard language is resolved in such a way that three constituent ethnic groups have their educational and cultural institutions in the standard varieties which are considered official languages at sub-state levels: Bosnian, Croatian and Serbian.

A Y chromosome haplogroups study published in 2005 found that "three main groups of Bosnia-Herzegovina, in spite of some quantitative differences, share a large fraction of the same ancient gene pool distinctive for the Balkan area". The study did however find that Serbs and Bosniaks are genetically closer to each other than either of them is to Croats.

Decision of the Constitutional Court of Bosnia and Herzegovina

On 12 February 1998, Alija Izetbegović, at the time Chair of the Presidency of Bosnia and Herzegovina, instituted proceedings before the Constitutional Court for an evaluation of the consistency of the Constitution of the Republika Srpska and the Constitution of the Federation of Bosnia and Herzegovina with the Constitution of Bosnia and Herzegovina. The request was supplemented on 30 March 1998 when the applicant specified which provisions of the Entities' Constitutions he considered to be unconstitutional.

The four partial decisions were made in 2000, by which many of the articles of the constitutions of entities were found to be unconstitutional, which had a great impact on the politics of Bosnia and Herzegovina because there was a need to adjust the current state in the country with the decision of the Court. A narrow majority (5-4) ruled in favour of the applicant. In its decision, among other things, the Court stated:

The formal name of this item is U-5/98, but it is widely known as the "Decision on the constituency of peoples", referring to the Court's interpretation of the significance of the phrase "constituent peoples" used in the Preamble of the Constitution of Bosnia and Herzegovina. The decision was also the basis for other notable cases that came before the court.

Historical background
Some argue that a Bosnian identity (in the non-religious sense) goes back centuries, the Serb and Croat for Christian Bosnians a century, and Bosniak (Bosnian Muslim) even more recently.

During the Ottoman Empire, the term Boşnak was used to describe Bosnians (of the Bosnia Eyalet) in an ethnic or "tribal" sense. After the Austro-Hungarian occupation of Bosnia and Herzegovina in 1878, the Austrian administration officially endorsed "Bosnianhood" as the basis of a multi-confessional Bosnian nation. The policy aspired to isolate Bosnia and Herzegovina from its irredentist neighbors (Orthodox Serbia, Catholic Croatia, and the Muslims of the Ottoman Empire) and to negate the concept of Croatian and Serbian nationhood which had already begun to take ground among Bosnia and Herzegovina's Catholic and Orthodox communities, respectively.

In the Kingdom of Yugoslavia, the Serbs, Croats and Slovenes were the constituent ("old") nations. During the reign of King Aleksandar I, a modern single Yugoslav identity was unsuccessfully propagated to erase the particularistic identities. With the formation of Socialist Yugoslavia, there were six republics and five constitutive nations, adding Macedonians and Montenegrins (whose identities were not earlier recognized); the Bosnian Muslims were recognized only in the late 1960s.

For the 1961 census a new ethnic category was introduced–Muslims–with which 972,954 Bosnians identified. In 1964, the Muslims were declared a narod ("people"), as the other five "peoples", but were not ascribed a national republic. In 1968, the Bosnian Central Committee declared that "...Muslims are a distinct nation". For the 1971 census, accordingly, "Muslims, in the sense of a nation" was introduced.

Inter-ethnic relations
Serbs tend to be Orthodox Christian, Croats tend to be Catholic, and Bosniaks tend to be Muslim. Tensions between these groups were expressed in terms of religion, and religious symbols continue to be used for nationalist purposes. Fundamentalists existed on all sides; so, in regards to propaganda supported by the views of religious leaders, the Bosnian War took on some features of a "religious war." Historical stereotypes and prejudice were further established by experiences of war. On the other hand, it has been found that direct individual experiences of war did not influence the individual's measured ethno-nationalism. The situation still impedes the development of relations post-war. It has been found that ethnic civil war alone does not have a tendency to increase the abundance of ethno-nationalism in a country; though, this is context-dependent. Karin Dyrstad argues that the Dayton agreement, although intended to improve relations following the war, damaged them and segregated the country even further. Her argument lies on her finding that local policy change provides the context which determines the lasting effect that ethnic civil wars have on ethno-nationalism. So, the Dayton agreement, she argues, is the local policy change that propelled the Bosnian War into having the disastrous post-war effects on inter-ethnic relations that it did. Conversely, the pluralistic makeup of the Dayton agreement suggested it would have a beneficial effect on inter-ethnic relations within the country. Before the war, Bosnia and Herzegovina had rather good inter-ethnic relations compared to other Western Balkan states. In the years following the war, all three ethnic groups experienced a drastic increase in the prevalence of ethno-nationalism, the group with the most dramatic shift being the Serbs. This increased ethno-nationalism contributed to the deterioration of inter-ethnic relations in the country. The prevalence of this ethno-nationalism can be displayed, in part, by the finding that, upon return, almost all displaced persons moved into an area in which their activated ethnic identity aligned with that of the majority. To further exacerbate ethnic homogeneity following the war, ethnic elites were known to sometimes halt the return of displaced persons to their pre-war place of residence.  

The magnitude of communal exposure to violence during the Bosnian War has continued to have significant resounding effects on inter-ethnic relations and the political system, even after twenty years. It has been found that communities that had a higher exposure to violence continue to have lower levels of inter-ethnic trust and associate more with their ethnic political party. This leads to ethnic voting, otherwise known as voting along ethnic party lines; though, the levels of ethnic voting have begun to dwindle in recent elections, suggesting the violence's effect on ethnic voting is beginning to decrease. Still, a lasting effect of this violence is that it eroded social networks that extended beyond an individual's ethnic group and diminished the probability of reforming them. Since discussions of the Bosnian War are often contained to the microcosm of an individual's predominantly homogenous social network, there tends to be an absence of opposing viewpoints, which cements ethnic boundaries based on ethnically biased collective memories. The evidence for this is strengthened by Hadzic et al.'s finding that those with social ties that are almost strictly contained to their own ethnic group also tend to have lower levels of inter-ethnic trust than those that do not. They also found that the Bosnian War led to increased ethnic homogeneity, which has been shown to influence government spending on ethnically homogenous areas in a way meant to further induce ethnic voting. 

Trends in the geographic concentration of development of more ethnically homogeneous areas during the war contributed to the location of the eventual Inter-Entity Boundary Line between the Federation of Bosnia and Herzegovina and the Republika Srpska. As a result, the differences in the ethnic makeups of the two entities are drastic; it has been estimated that Bosniaks make up around 73% of the population of the Federation of Bosnia and Herzegovina, while Serbs make up around 81% of the population of the Republika Srpska. All of these factors help to explain the extremity of political polarization along ethnic cleavages, which Larisa Kurtovic termed "ethnic hyper-representation." Hadzic et al. argues that ethnic parties are harming Bosnia and Herzegovina's development and preventing the betterment of inter-ethnic relations, as they are incentivized to withhold universally beneficial policies in order to avoid unintentionally helping out-group members. This argument is reinforced by the counteractive implications of the slogan of the Republika Srpska's governing party: "RS forever and B&H while it has to last." Politicizing ethnicity makes it a focal point of people's everyday lives, driving behavior, cognition, and their experience of emotion. In effect, this politicization perpetuates the poor inter-ethnic relations that have continued to embody Bosnia and Herzegovina since at least the adoption of the Dayton Agreement.

See also
History of Bosnia and Herzegovina
Demographics of Bosnia and Herzegovina
Yugoslav wars
1953 population census in Bosnia and Herzegovina
Romani people in Bosnia and Herzegovina

References

Sources

Further reading